Of the 10 Missouri incumbents, 8 were re-elected.

See also 
 List of United States representatives from Missouri
 United States House of Representatives elections, 1972

1972
Missouri
1972 Missouri elections